Elina Avanesyan and Oksana Selekhmeteva were the defending champions but chose not to participate.

Jéssica Bouzas Maneiro and Leyre Romero Gormaz won the title, defeating Lucía Cortez Llorca and Rosa Vicens Mas in the final, 1–6, 7–5, [10–6].

Seeds

Draw

Draw

References

External Links
Main Draw

ITF World Tennis Tour Gran Canaria - Doubles